Fietje Peters, Poste Restante  is a 1935 Dutch comedy film drama directed by Victor Janson.

Cast
Hilde Alexander		
Fien Berghegge	... 	Inez (as Fientje Berghegge)
Louis Borel	... 	Vriend van Van Noort
Dolly Bouwmeester	... 	Fientje Peters
Alex De Meester		
Marie Faassen		
Cor Hermus	... 	Vader Van Noort
Margot Hoppenbrouwers		
Rob Milton		(as Robert Milton)
Wim Poncia		
Jean Stapelveld		
Herman Tholen	... 	Van Noort

External links 
 

1935 films
Dutch black-and-white films
1935 comedy films
Dutch multilingual films
Dutch comedy films
1935 multilingual films
1930s Dutch-language films